XHACS-FM is a radio station on 103.1 FM in Playa del Carmen, Quintana Roo. It is known as Playa FM 103.1.

History
On November 17, 2015, Arte y Cultura por Solidaridad, owned by Manuel Isaac and Fayne Yazmin Caballero Colli, applied for the 103.1 social frequency at Playa del Carmen that the Federal Telecommunications Institute (IFT) had made available in its 2015 FM station program. A competing application was filed on November 30 by Yantra Informativo Fusión, A.C.

The two applications were adjudicated by the IFT on February 14, 2018. The IFT chose Arte y Cultura por Solidaridad, noting that stakeholders in the other applicant, Yantra Informativo Fusión, were associated with Grupo Acustik, a new media group that won 15 radio stations in the IFT-4 auction of 2017. Because the principals of Arte y Cultura por Solidaridad owned no radio stations, their application was chosen, and 103.1 was given the callsign XHACS-FM.

XHACS-FM began testing in July 2017 and adopted the name "Playa FM". Related social applicants also won stations at the IFT in 2018, for XHICT-FM 104.7 "Tulum FM" and XHCCE-FM 90.5 "Jaguar FM" in Chetumal.

References

Radio stations in Quintana Roo
Radio stations established in 2018
2018 establishments in Mexico